FQA may refer to:

 Final quality audit, the last process flow before shipping a product
 Floristic Quality Assessment, a tool used to assess an area's ecological integrity
 FQA, the ICAO code for Quikjet Airlines, Bangalore, India